Bulbasaur is a Grass/Poison-type Pokémon species in Nintendo and Game Freak's Pokémon franchise. It is the first in the franchise's monster index, called a Pokédex. Designed by Atsuko Nishida, Bulbasaur debuted in Pocket Monsters: Red and Green (Pokémon Red and Blue outside Japan) as a starter Pokémon. Since then, it has reappeared in subsequent sequels, spin-off games, related merchandise, and animated and printed adaptations of the franchise.

Known as the Seed Pokémon, Bulbasaur can survive for days solely on sunlight. It likes to take a nap in the sunshine. While it sleeps, the seed on its back catches the rays and uses the energy to grow. It is a central character in the Pokémon anime, being one of Ash Ketchum's main Pokémon for the first season, and a different one later being obtained by May. It is featured in various manga, and is owned by protagonist Red in the Pokémon Adventures manga. Bulbasaur has been featured in myriad pieces of merchandise, including toys, key chains, and plush dolls.

Bulbasaur can evolve into Ivysaur at level 16, and can further evolve into Venusaur at level 32. Venusaur can also evolve into Mega Venusaur if the player equips it with a Venusaurite, but this feature was only first added to the Pokémon games in Pokémon X and Y.

Conception and design
Bulbasaur was designed by Atsuko Nishida, one of the character designers for Pocket Monsters Red and Blue, who based its design on Ivysaur, the mid-evolved form of Bulbasaur. The species first appeared as one of three starter Pokémon the player could choose from at the beginning of the initial Game Boy games, Pokémon Red and Blue, released in Japan in 1996. In translating the game for English speaking audiences, Nintendo gave the Pokémon "cleverly descriptive names" related to their appearance or features as a means to make the characters more relatable to American children; thus Bulbasaur, a portmanteau relating to both its dinosaurian appearance and the large garlic-shaped bulb on its back. Both the etymology and appearance of Bulbasaur, Ivysaur and Venusaur convey a transition of this Pokémon from the harmless to the dangerous as it evolves. The idea to feature Bulbasaur and the other Red and Blue starters in a significant role in Pokémon X and Y came about a year and a half into the development of the games. The Mega Evolutions for the three Pokémon's final forms were created, and the designers decided that they should give players an opportunity to receive one of these Pokémon from Professor Sycamore, the games professor, to see their Mega Evolved form.

Characteristics
Despite their English names, Ken Sugimori confirmed that the design of Bulbasaur and its evolutions are based on onions and bulldogs, albeit identified more with a smaller Dicynodont. In the Pokémon franchise, Bulbasaur are small, squat amphibian and plant Pokémon that move on all four legs, and have blue-green bodies with darker blue-green spots. As a Bulbasaur undergoes evolution into Ivysaur and then later into Venusaur, the bulb on its back blossoms into a large flower. The seed on a Bulbasaur's back is planted at birth and then sprouts and grows larger as the Bulbasaur grows. The bulb absorbs sunlight which allows it to grow, and for this reason, Bulbasaur enjoy soaking up the sun's rays. They can also survive for days without eating because the bulb stores energy. The distinctive differences of Bulbasaur from other Pokémon such as Diglett are well understood by children and so motivate their play and trading of the creature.

Appearances

In the video games
Bulbasaur made its video game debut on February 27, 1996, in the Japanese-language games Pocket Monsters Red and Green. Along with Charmander and Squirtle, Bulbasaur is a starter Pokémon the player can choose from at the beginning of the games. Bulbasaur's dual typing of Grass and Poison type is in contrast to Charmander's Fire type and Squirtle's Water type. Bulbasaur is the only starter in Red, Blue, and Green that has a dual typing. Bulbasaur and the other starters from Red and Blue are replaced by Pikachu in Pokémon Yellow, the only starter available in it. Instead, they are obtained throughout the game from several NPCs. In Pokémon FireRed and LeafGreen, remakes of Red and Blue, Bulbasaur is selectable as a starter Pokémon once again, along with Charmander and Squirtle. In Pokémon HeartGold and SoulSilver, after obtaining all sixteen badges and defeating Red, the player can choose to obtain either Bulbasaur, Charmander, or Squirtle. You can also find them in the Pal Park field in Pokemon Diamond and Pearl, Pokemon Platinum and Pokémon HeartGold and SoulSilver. In Pokémon X and Y, players can also choose between Bulbasaur, Charmander, and Squirtle near the start of the game shortly after having chosen the games' new starter Pokémon. In Pokémon Sword and Shield: The Isle Of Armor, you can find one in the Master Dojo.

The Nintendo 64 spin-off Pokémon Stadium, and other spin-offs such as Pokémon Mystery Dungeon, give the player a choice of a Bulbasaur (among fifteen other Pokémon), and in Pokémon Snap, Bulbasaur are one of the Pokémon that the player can photograph. It also appears in Pokémon Puzzle League as one of Ash's Pokémon. Bulbasaur also appears in Hey You, Pikachu! as a supporting character who lives in the Ochre Woods and makes the five recipes with Pikachu's help. In Super Smash Bros. Melee and Brawl, Bulbasaur appears as one of the obtainable trophies. Bulbasaur appears in PokéPark Wii: Pikachu's Adventure as the host of a mini-game called "Daring Dash". In 2016, Bulbasaur was one of the four starter Pokémon in Pokémon Go, and appearing also in Pokémon Unite and New Pokémon Snap.

In the anime
Scenes from the Pokémon anime have depicted both the characters Ash and May training a Bulbasaur at different times, with Ash's Bulbasaur garnering more prominence within the storylines. Ash's Bulbasaur has remained with Ash longer than all of his other Pokémon, with the exception of his Pikachu. Before joining Ash's team, it lives with a girl named Melanie, who takes care of abandoned Pokémon. Bulbasaur is given to Ash, but it is pessimistic about him. However, its loyalties begin to improve and it eventually becomes one of Ash's most faithful Pokémon. May catches a Bulbasaur while traveling in a grass-type Pokémon nature reserve during her journey in Hoenn. Bulbasaur defends her from the other grass Pokémon in the forest, who see her as a threat, and when May leaves, Bulbasaur decides to go with her. She later makes a guest appearance on the series and it is revealed that her Bulbasaur has fully evolved into a Venusaur.

In the original Japanese version the two Bulbasaur are each played by separate voice actresses, Ash's Bulbasaur by Megumi Hayashibara and May's by Miyako Itō. In the English dub, they are both voiced by Tara Jayne until Michele Knotz took over the job for the ninth season.

In other media
Bulbasaur is featured in an eclectic range of different Pokémon manga series. In Pokémon: Pikachu Shocks Back, Electric Pikachu Boogaloo, and Surf's Up, Pikachu!, which loosely parallel the storyline of the anime, Pikachu is separated from Ash temporarily, and travels with a Bulbasaur to a secret Pokémon village in the mountains. Later, Ash finds Pikachu and catches the Bulbasaur. Bulbasaur accompanies Ash throughout his journeys in the Orange Islands, and eventually fights in the final showdown with Drake, the Orange Crew Supreme Gym Leader. In Magical Pokémon Journey, a character named Pistachio has a female Bulbasaur (nicknamed Danerina in the Japanese version), who is infatuated by him.

In Pokémon Adventures, a manga based on the plot of the Pokémon Red and Blue games, the character Red receives a Bulbasaur from Professor Oak, which he nicknames Saur. In Chapter 15, "Wartortle Wars", it evolves into an Ivysaur after battling a wild Mankey. A Bulbasaur owned by Red appeared in the first episode of Pokemon Generations. Bulbasaur is the main character of two Pokémon children's books, Pokémon Tales Volume 3: Bulbasaur's Trouble and Bulbasaur's Bad Day, published in 1999 and 2000 respectively by Sagebrush. In Pokémon Tales Volume 3: Bulbasaur's Trouble, Bulbasaur resolves an argument between two other Pokémon. In Bulbasaur's Bad Day, Meowth traps Bulbasaur in a pit and it has to outwit Team Rocket (the antagonists of the Pokémon anime) to escape. Bulbasaur also appears in the movie Pokemon: Detective Pikachu, where a herd of them lead Pikachu for Mewtwo to heal. In making the film, a bulldog was used to understand the top-heavy movement of Bulbasaur. Then puppeteers in London were hired to create 3D puppets of it. Facial expressions and texture details were added using CGI.

Bulbasaur is set to be featured alongside other iconic Generation I Pokémon in a version of the Labyrinth board game in 2021.

Promotion and merchandising
Bulbasaur has been featured in varying pieces of merchandise, including toys and plush dolls. Bulbasaur has been depicted in action figures sold by Hasbro in the United States, while Tomy in Japan sold extensive merchandise of the character, including vinyl dolls, wind-up model kits, Singaporean popcorn, and terry cloth bean bags. It has also been used in promotional merchandising at fast-food chains such as McDonald's and Burger King. Bulbasaur has also been included in various versions of the Pokémon painting on ANA Boeing 767s. In 2021, Seiko  made limited edition luxury watches based on Bulbasaur and its evolutionary family. The watches also depict its famous Solar Beam attack. The island nation of Niue issued a commemorative coin with a legal tender value of one crown which has a Bulbasaur on the reverse side.

Bulbasaur was also among the eleven Pokémon chosen as Japan's mascots in the 2014 FIFA World Cup.

Reception and legacy
Bulbasaur has been largely praised by critics for its appearance, especially in the Pokémon anime. Nintendo World Report's Pedro Hernandez called it his favorite Pokémon, noting that it represented a number of firsts for him: his first episode of the anime, his first Pokémon, and the first one he saw in 3D. Calling Bulbasaur the reason he became interested in the Pokémon series, he stated that he was "deeply touched" by how it refused to evolve in the anime in order to "prove his self-worth as his un-evolved form". IGN editor "Pokémon of the Day Chick" also praised Ash's "attitude-packing Bulbasaur" in the anime, and Official Nintendo Magazines John Vekinis attributed his "love of Grass-type Pokémon" to Bulbasaur in spite of the Grass type's weaknesses.

Chris Plante of Polygon called Bulbasaur "the best Pokémon all along", citing that series producer and director Junichi Masuda defended Bulbasaur as the best starter Pokémon, calling it "really cute, as a character," and "a very Pokémon-like Pokémon" that "kind of exemplifies what Pokémon is for me" due to its monster and plant combination. Plante called Bulbasaur and its evolutions "comparably dull", but, nevertheless, stated that they were "the most true to life", as it looked more "leathery and aged" as it got older in comparison to the other starters. Cass Marshall and Julia Lee of the same publication described Bulbasaur on Detective Pikachu as "unassuming and sweet," a creature who makes a "lovable friend."

The fan wiki Bulbapedia, a wiki dedicated solely to the Pokémon franchise, is named after Bulbasaur.

Notes

References

External links

 Bulbasaur on Bulbapedia
 Bulbasaur on Pokemon.com

Anthropomorphic dinosaurs
Fictional characters with plant abilities
Fictional frogs
Fictional whip users
Plant characters
Pokémon species
Video game characters introduced in 1996